Julie MacPherson (born 17 November 1997) is a Scottish badminton player who competes in international level events. She affiliate with club V3F, Mulhouse. She has won the Scottish National Championships four times in the women's doubles and two times in the mixed doubles. She also part of team Scotland that won the bronze medal at the 2020 European Women's Team Championships.

MacPherson won the girls' singles bronze medal at the European U17 Championships in 2014. She has competed at the 2018 Commonwealth Games where she reached the quarterfinals in the mixed team event.

Achievements

BWF International Challenge/Series (2 titles, 3 runners-up) 
Women's doubles

Mixed doubles

  BWF International Challenge tournament
  BWF International Series tournament
  BWF Future Series tournament

BWF Junior International (2 runners-up) 
Girls' doubles

Mixed doubles

  BWF Junior International Grand Prix tournament
  BWF Junior International Challenge tournament
  BWF Junior International Series tournament
  BWF Junior Future Series tournament

References

External links 
 

1997 births
Living people
Sportspeople from Edinburgh
Scottish female badminton players
Badminton players at the 2018 Commonwealth Games
Badminton players at the 2022 Commonwealth Games
Commonwealth Games competitors for Scotland